Hebius septemlineatus, the Tengchong keelback snake, is a species of snake of the family Colubridae. It is endemic to western Yunnan, China. The vernacular name refers to its type locality, Tengchong.

Males measure  and females  in snout–vent length.

References 

septemlineatus
Snakes of China
Endemic fauna of Yunnan
Reptiles described in 1925
Taxa named by Karl Patterson Schmidt